Gowienica Miedwiańska is a river of Poland, which flows into the lake Miedwie near Stargard. Miedwie is drained by the Płonia.

Rivers of Poland
Rivers of West Pomeranian Voivodeship